The Embassy of Moldova in London is the diplomatic mission of Moldova in the United Kingdom. It is far removed from other diplomatic missions in London, being situated in the West London suburb of Chiswick.

List of Ambassadors

See also
 Moldova–United Kingdom relations

References

External links
Official site

Moldova
Diplomatic missions of Moldova
Moldova–United Kingdom relations
Buildings and structures in the London Borough of Hounslow
Chiswick
Buildings and structures in Chiswick